Du Juan (杜 娟, born 18 March 1968) is a Chinese hurdler. She competed in the women's 100 metres hurdles at the 1988 Summer Olympics.

References

1968 births
Living people
Athletes (track and field) at the 1988 Summer Olympics
Chinese female hurdlers
Olympic athletes of China
Place of birth missing (living people)